FJM may refer to:

 Fallschirmjäger-Messer, a German World War II paratrooper knife
 Father John Misty, American musician
 Fire Joe Morgan, a sports blog
 Fly Jamaica Airways, a Jamaican airline
 The Four Just Men (novel) by Edgar Wallace
 Frank J. Myers, American singer with the label FJM
 Freefall jumpmaster
 Fujairah Men's College in the United Arab Emirates